William and Air Raid Precautions is the 21st book of children's short stories in the Just William series by Richmal Crompton. This was one of the books set against the backdrop of World War II.

Short stories
William and A.R.P.
William's Good-Bye Present
William's Day Off
Portrait of William
William the Dog Trainer
William and the Vanishing Luck
William's Bad Resolution
William and the Badminton Racket
William and the Begging Letter

1939 short story collections
Just William
Short story collections by Richmal Crompton
Children's short story collections
1939 children's books
George Newnes Ltd books